Robyn Hitchcock is an English singer-songwriter and guitarist.

Robyn Hitchcock may also refer to:
 Robyn Hitchcock (1995 album), a compilation album by Robyn Hitchcock
 Robyn Hitchcock (2017 album), a studio album by Robyn Hitchcock